Víctor Abel Fatecha Riveros (born 10 March 1988 in Concepción) is a Paraguayan athlete specializing in the javelin throw. He competed at the 2008 Olympic Games in Beijing without reaching the final.

Fatecha is tied to Paraguay Marathon Club and competes in Paraguay's national competitions under the Federación Paraguaya de Atletismo.

He belongs to a line of Paraguayan throwers, such as Ramón Jiménez Gaona (discus), Nery Kennedy (javelin) and Edgar Baumann (javelin), who all had successful careers.

In 2014 Fatecha was one of three Paraguayan throwers to reach over 70 metres, including Larson Giovanni Diaz Martinez and Fabian Jara.

Victor Fatecha is the younger brother of association footballer Cristian Fatecha.

Clubs
  Olimpia Asunción (2005)
  Universidad Autónoma de Asunción (–2013)
  Paraguay Marathon Club (2014–)

Coaches
 Thomas Zuddy (2004)
  Claudio Zúñiga (2005)
  Plinio Penzzi

Personal bests
Javelin throw: 79.03 m –  Moscow, 15 August 2013

Seasonal bests
IAAF Profile

700g
2003 - 65.52
2004 - 74.11
2005 - 77.21 (PB)

800g
2004 - 68.25
2005 - 69.32
2006 - 76.79
2007 - 78.01
2008 - 76.55
2009 - 77.82
2010 - 76.34
2011 - 76.92
2012 - 75.15
2013 - 79.03 (PB)
2014 - 76.09
2015 - 77.69
2016 - 75.20 
2017 - 74.57
2018 - 71.55

Competition record

International Competitions

National Competitions

References

External links
 
 Sports reference biography

1988 births
Living people
People from Concepción, Paraguay
Paraguayan male javelin throwers
Athletes (track and field) at the 2008 Summer Olympics
Athletes (track and field) at the 2007 Pan American Games
Athletes (track and field) at the 2011 Pan American Games
Olympic athletes of Paraguay
Pan American Games competitors for Paraguay
Athletes (track and field) at the 2015 Pan American Games
World Athletics Championships athletes for Paraguay
South American Games gold medalists for Paraguay
South American Games medalists in athletics
Competitors at the 2014 South American Games
Athletes (track and field) at the 2018 South American Games
21st-century Paraguayan people